Strand is a 2009 Iranian experimental film directed by Rouzbeh Rashidi that tells the visual bond between nostalgia and physical reality, the liquid phase produced by the condensation of Stream of consciousness will evolve through the film and manifests itself using images and sounds. Strand is a personal journey in memory and time using human models, landscapes and cityscapes of Iran in order to explore the emotion hidden in past and future.

Production
Rashidi made this film with no/low budget over a three months period in summer 2008. Shot in stark black and white, the film deals with images of love, friendship, separation, loneliness and isolation; a "strand" of life in modern-day Iran. The usage of Direct Cinema and cinéma vérité techniques, non-diegetic sound, Super 8mm, stock footage and heavily manipulative editing are the common stylistic styles that shapes Strand.

Reception
Strand premiered in Short Film Corner of Cannes Film Festival (May 2009 Cannes - France). Shortlisted for Culture Unplugged filMedia platform, Culture Unplugged (Online Festival) efforts are focused on enabling networks of socially & spiritually conscious content and its creators. With presence in India, US, UK, Indonesia and New Zealand. The film "Strand – 2008" remained at this venue for 6 months (180 days).

References

External links
 
 Strand on Mubi (website)

2009 films
Films set in Iran
Iranian avant-garde and experimental films
Iranian black-and-white films
Iranian short films
2009 short films
2000s avant-garde and experimental films
2000s English-language films